Baloghella is a genus of mites in the family Acaridae.

Species
 Baloghella melis Mahunka, 1963

References

Acaridae